Comadia alleni is a moth in the family Cossidae. It is found in North America, where it has been recorded from California.

The length of the forewings is 17–18 mm. The ground colour of the forewings is white with a band of suffused fuscous. The hindwings are fuscous, the veins are outlined in dark. Adults have been recorded on wing from May to June.

References

Natural History Museum Lepidoptera generic names catalog

Cossinae
Moths described in 1976
Moths of North America